Anthony McCall: The Solid Light Films and Related Works is a nonfiction book on avant-garde artist Anthony McCall and his work in cinema. The book was edited by Christopher Eamon with contributions by Branden W. Joseph and Jonathan Walley and was published in 2005 by Northwestern University Press, in association with the New Art Trust in San Francisco, California.

References

External links
Review at kultureflash.net

2005 non-fiction books
Books by Christopher Eamon
Books about film